Junia Tertia, also called Tertulla, (c. 75 BC – 22 AD) was the third daughter of Servilia and her second husband Decimus Junius Silanus, and later the wife of Gaius Cassius Longinus.

Biography

Early life
Through her mother she was the younger half-sister of Marcus Junius Brutus, she also had two older sisters Junia Prima and Junia Secunda as well as an older brother named Marcus Junius Silanus.

Marriage and later life
Tertia married Gaius Cassius Longinus, they had one son, who was born in about 59-60 BC. She had a miscarriage in 44 BC. In 47 BC, it was rumored that she was Julius Caesar's lover through her mother's arrangement.

Like her mother, Tertia was allowed to outlive her husband Cassius, unmolested by the triumvirs and Augustus. She survived to an advanced age, dying in 22 AD, 64 years after the battle at Philippi, during the reign of the emperor Tiberius. She had amassed a great estate in her long widowhood, and left her fortune to many prominent Romans, although excluded the emperor, which was met with criticism. Tiberius forgave the omission and still allowed a large funeral to be held in her honor, though the masks of Brutus and Cassius were to not be displayed in the procession.

Through her son she may have ended up as an ancestress to the empress Domitia Longina.

Family tree

See also
 Junia gens
 Tertulla

References

Further reading
 GLIMRE VED SITT FRAVÆR
 https://eugesta-revue.univ-lille.fr/pdf/2017/5.Webb-Eugesta-7_2017.pdf

External links

70s BC births
22 deaths
1st-century BC Roman women
1st-century BC Romans
1st-century Roman women
Children of Servilia (mother of Brutus)
Family of Marcus Junius Brutus
Mistresses of Julius Caesar
Tertia